Antônio Nunes, better known as Lico (born 9 August 1951) is a Brazilian former professional football player and manager who played as a midfielder and striker. He was a club icon for Brazilian football clubs Joinville and Flamengo, winning the 1981 Copa Libertadores and Intercontinental Cup with the latter.

Career

Playing career 
Born in Santa Catarina, Lico began his professional career with América of Joinville in 1970. Two years later, he was loaned to Grêmio where he was a reserve for six months in 1973. Following this loan he returned to Santa Catarina football, playing for Figueirense, Marcílio Dias, Avaí and Joinville. For Joinville the left-winger was a two-time state champion (1979-80), becoming an idol of the fans.

In 1980, Lico moved to Rio de Janeiro joining Flamengo. He would arrive at the club at the request of manager Cláudio Coutinho to be a substitute for Zico. Lico did not become a starter immediately. He made sporadic appearances in the Campeonato Carioca that year, mostly coming off the bench. He returned to Joinville on loan at the beginning of 1981 but returned to Flamengo in May, fortunate to play alongside stars Zico, Leandro, Andrade, Júnior and Adílio, being a key part of the club's historic conquest of the Copa Libertadores and Intercontinental Cup of 1981.

After two knee surgeries, Lico was forced to retire in 1984 at the age of 33.

Managerial career 
After retiring from play, Lico turned to managing. He only managed clubs from his home region in the south of Brazil including Londrina, Avaí, and Joinville.

Career statistics

Club

International

Titles 
Figueirense
 Campeonato Catarinense: 1974

Joinville
 Campeonato Catarinense: 1979, 1980

Flamengo
 Copa Libertadores: 1981
 Intercontinental Cup: 1981
 Campeonato Carioca: 1981
 Campeonato Brasileiro: 1982, 1983
 Taça Guanabara: 1981, 1982, 1984
 Taça Rio: 1983
 City of Santander Cup: 1980

References

1951 births
Brazilian footballers
Living people
Association football forwards
Association football midfielders
Joinville Esporte Clube players
CR Flamengo footballers